Major David Nelson VC (3 April 1887 – 8 April 1918) was an Irish recipient of the Victoria Cross, the highest and most prestigious award for gallantry in the face of the enemy that can be awarded to British and Commonwealth forces.

Military career

Nelson was born Deraghland, Stranooden, County Monaghan, Ireland, to David Nelson and Mary Anne Black. He was 28 years old, and a sergeant in 'L' Battery, Royal Horse Artillery (RHA), British Army during World War I when the following deed took place for which he was awarded the VC.

On 1 September 1914 at Néry, France, Sergeant Nelson helped to bring the guns into action – with an officer (Edward Kinder Bradbury) and a warrant officer (George Thomas Dorrell) – under heavy fire and in spite of being severely wounded. He remained with the guns until all the ammunition was expended, although he had been ordered to retire to cover.

Nelson later achieved the rank of major. He was killed in action at Lillers, France, on 8 April 1918.

His Victoria Cross is displayed at the Imperial War Museum in London.

References

Listed in order of publication year 
The Register of the Victoria Cross (1981, 1988 and 1997)

Ireland's VCs  (Dept of Economic Development, 1995)
Monuments to Courage (David Harvey, 1999)
Irish Winners of the Victoria Cross (Richard Doherty & David Truesdale, 2000)

External links
 Dictionary of Ulster Biography
 

1880s births
1918 deaths
Irish officers in the British Army
People from County Monaghan
Irish World War I recipients of the Victoria Cross
Royal Artillery officers
British military personnel killed in World War I
British Army personnel of World War I
Royal Horse Artillery soldiers
British Army recipients of the Victoria Cross
British World War I recipients of the Victoria Cross
Military personnel from County Monaghan